The men's parallel bars competition was one of eight events for male competitors in artistic gymnastics at the 1968 Summer Olympics in Mexico City. There were 117 competitors from 28 nations, with nations in the team competition having up to 6 gymnasts and other nations entering up to 3 gymnasts. The event was won by Akinori Nakayama of Japan, the nation's second consecutive victory in the parallel bars event, tying Germany and the Soviet Union for second-most all-time behind Switzerland at three gold medals. It was the second of four straight Games that the parallel bars would be won by a Japanese gymnast. Mikhail Voronin took silver and Viktor Klimenko took bronze to put the Soviet Union back on the podium after a one-Games absence.

Background

This was the 12th appearance of the event, which is one of the five apparatus events held every time there were apparatus events at the Summer Olympics (no apparatus events were held in 1900, 1908, 1912, or 1920). Five of the six finalists from 1964 returned: gold medalist Yukio Endo of Japan, bronze medalist Franco Menichelli of Italy, fourth-place finisher Sergey Diomidov and fifth-place finisher Victor Lisitsky of the Soviet Union, and sixth-place finisher Miroslav Cerar of Yugoslavia. Diomidov had won the 1966 world championship, with fellow Soviet Mikhail Voronin second and Cerar third.

Ecuador and the Philippines each made their debut in the men's parallel bars; East and West Germany competed separately for the first time. The United States made its 11th appearance, most of any nation, having missed only the inaugural 1896 Games.

Competition format

Each nation entered a team of six gymnasts or up to three individual gymnasts. All entrants in the gymnastics competitions performed both a compulsory exercise and a voluntary exercise for each apparatus. The scores for all 12 exercises were summed to give an individual all-around score.

These exercise scores were also used for qualification for the new apparatus finals. The two exercises (compulsory and voluntary) for each apparatus were summed to give an apparatus score; the top 6 in each apparatus participated in the finals; others were ranked 7th through 117th. In the final, each gymnast performed an additional voluntary exercise; half of the score from the preliminary carried over.

Schedule

All times are Central Standard Time (UTC-6)

Results

References

Official Olympic Report
www.gymnasticsresults.com
www.gymn-forum.net

Women's individual all-around
Men's 1968
Men's events at the 1968 Summer Olympics